Gdyel is a district in Oran Province, Algeria. It was named after its capital, Gdyel, on the Mediterranean Sea.

Municipalities
The district is further divided into 3 municipalities:
Gdyel
Hassi Mefsoukh
Ben Freha

Districts of Oran Province